Hans Schenk may refer to:

 Hans Schenk (athlete) (1936–2006), German javelin thrower
 Hans Schenk (economist) (born 1949), Dutch economist